Fowkes v Pascoe (1875) LR 10 Ch App 343 is an English trusts law case, concerning the circumstances when a resulting trust arises.

Facts
Mrs Baker bought two sums of stock. One was put in the names of herself and a young lodger called Mr Pascoe, who she treated like a grandson. The other was in her and her friend's name. It was argued by the executor, Fowkes, that when Mrs Baker died Pascoe held the stock on resulting trust.

Judgment
James LJ held that although a presumption of a resulting trust applied, it was rebutted on the facts, because plainly Mrs Baker intended to make a gift to Mr Pascoe.

See also

English trust law

Notes

References

English trusts case law
Court of Appeal (England and Wales) cases
1875 in British law
1875 in case law